The Bülow Memorial on Unter den Linden avenue in Berlin's Mitte district commemorates the Prussian army general and freedom fighter Friedrich Wilhelm Bülow von Dennewitz (1755–1816). Created from 1819 to 1822 by Christian Daniel Rauch in neoclassical style, it is a masterpiece of the Berlin school of sculpture.

Until 1951 the memorial stood to the left of the Neue Wache, with which it formed an urban ensemble, and since 2002 it has stood opposite it. The marble statue was removed in 2021 due to weathering and will be replaced by a replica. In this context the re-erection at the original location is being discussed.

Gallery

See also 
 Scharnhorst Memorial, Berlin

References

Further reading

External links 

 Bülow Memorial – Berlin Monument Authority (in German)

1822 sculptures
Marble sculptures in Germany
Mitte
Monuments and memorials in Berlin
Sculptures of men in Germany
Statues in Berlin